Harbhajan Singh Cheema is an Indian politician and member of the Bharatiya Janata Party. Cheema is a member of the Uttarakhand Legislative Assembly from the Kashipur constituency in Udham Singh Nagar district.

References 

People from Udham Singh Nagar district
Bharatiya Janata Party politicians from Uttarakhand
Members of the Uttarakhand Legislative Assembly
Living people
Year of birth missing (living people)